Xian County or Xianxian is a county in the east of Hebei province of China. It is under the administration of the prefecture-level city of Cangzhou.

Administrative divisions

Towns:
Leshou, Huaizhen, Guozhuang, Hechengjie

Townships:
Hancun Township, Monan Township, Chenzhuang Township, Gaoguan Township, Shanglin Township, Duancun Township, Zhangcun Township, Linhe Township, Shuipingwang Township, Shiwuji Township, Leitou Township, Nanhetou Township, Xicheng Township, Benzhai Hui Ethnic Township

Climate

See also
 Séraphin Couvreur, a French sinologist, died in Xian county in 1919.
 Roman Catholic Diocese of Xianxian

References

External links

 
County-level divisions of Hebei
Cangzhou